CR4 may refer to:

Science and technology
 Complement receptor 4, a complement receptor in the immune system
 CR4, a control register in the x86 CPU architecture
 100GBASE-CR4 and 40GBASE-CR4, in 100 Gigabit Ethernet and 40 Gigabit Ethernet

Other uses
 CR4, four-firm concentration ratio, a measure of market concentration in economics
 CR4, a postcode district in the CR postcode area in England
 Pasir Ris East MRT station (CR4), an upcoming MRT station on the Cross Island Line in Singapore